Ceriantheomorphe is a genus of tube-dwelling anemones in the family Cerianthidae.

Species
The World Register of Marine Species includes the following species in the genus :

Ceriantheomorphe ambonensis (Kwietniewski, 1898)
Ceriantheomorphe brasiliensis Carlgren, 1931

References

Cerianthidae
Anthozoa genera